Within psychological testing, the Scale for the Assessment of Positive Symptoms (SAPS) is a rating scale to measure positive symptoms in schizophrenia. The scale was developed by Nancy Andreasen and was first published in 1984. SAPS is split into 4 domains, and within each domain separate symptoms are rated from 0 (absent) to 5 (severe). The scale is closely linked to the Scale for the Assessment of Negative Symptoms (SANS) which was published a few years earlier.

Items

Hallucinations
Auditory Hallucinations
Voices Commenting
Voices Conversing
Somatic or Tactile Hallucinations
Olfactory Hallucinations
Visual Hallucinations
Global Rating of Severity of Hallucinations

Delusions
Persecutory Delusions
Delusions of Jealousy
Delusions of Sin or Guilt
Grandiose Delusions
Religious Delusions
Somatic Delusions
Ideas and Delusions of Reference
Delusions of Being Controlled
Delusions of Mind Reading
Thought Broadcasting
Thought Insertion
Thought Withdrawal
Global Rating of Severity of Delusions

Bizarre Behaviour
Clothing and Appearance
Social and Sexual Behavior
Aggressive and Agitated Behavior
Repetitive or Stereotyped Behavior
Global Rating of Severity of Bizarre Behavior

Positive Formal Thought Disorder
Derailment (loose associations)
Tangentiality
Incoherence (Word salad, Schizophasia)
Illogicality
Circumstantiality
Pressure of speech
Distractible speech
Clanging
Global Rating of Positive Formal Thought Disorder

See also 
Brief Psychiatric Rating Scale (BPRS)
Diagnostic classification and rating scales used in psychiatry
Positive and Negative Syndrome Scale (PANSS)
Scale for the Assessment of Negative Symptoms (SANS)

References

Psychosis screening and assessment tools